John Ormsby (6 November 1854 – 11 June 1927), also known under his Māori name Hone Omipi, was a negotiator for the Ngāti Maniapoto iwi, a local politician, farmer, and businessman.

References

1854 births
1927 deaths
Māori politicians
Ngāti Maniapoto people